School Board is a Metromover station near the northwestern end of Downtown, Miami, Florida, south of Midtown and west of the Arts & Entertainment District. It is the northern terminus of the people mover system.

This station is located near the intersection of Northeast 15th Avenue and Miami Place, about one block north of the Miami-Dade County Public Schools Administration Building. It opened to service May 26, 1994. School Board has consistently been one of the lowest used stations in the system, with well under 1,000 riders a day. As of 2017, two large apartment buildings totaling over 1,200 units were under construction nearby, such as Canvas and Square Station, Art Plaza, and Miami Plaza, with others planned. Prior to this, the station was surrounded by mostly empty lots.

Station layout

Places of interest
Miami-Dade County Public Schools Administration Building
Fisher Medical Building
Overtown

References

External links
 
 MDT – Metromover Stations
 Miami Place entrance from Google Maps Street View

Metromover stations
Railway stations in the United States opened in 1994
1994 establishments in Florida
Omni Loop